Ofer Yom-Tov Verta (born 23 May 1990) is an Israeli footballer who plays for Hapoel Ashdod as a defender.

References

External links
 

1990 births
Living people
Israeli footballers
Association football defenders
F.C. Ashdod players
Hapoel Tel Aviv F.C. players
Beitar Jerusalem F.C. players
Hapoel Nof HaGalil F.C. players
Hapoel Ramat Gan F.C. players
Hapoel Ashdod F.C. players
Israeli Premier League players
Liga Leumit players
Footballers from Ashdod
Israel under-21 international footballers